Koyonzo is a settlement in Kenya's Western Province, Kakamega county. It was initially known as Mamboleo due to its early exposure to the long-distance traders from the Mombasa to Buganda Kingdom. Koyonzo was in the Wanga Kingdom which was led by Nabongo Mumia. It is currently located along Mumias-Busia Road, a gateway to Uganda. The town is surrounded by the villages of Ngairwe, Munanziri, Mung'ungu, Mwira, Mirere, Matungu, Ejinja and Lunganyiro.

References 

Populated places in Western Province (Kenya)
Kakamega County